Marcel Edwin Rodrigues Lavinier (born 16 December 2000) is a professional footballer who plays as a right-back for  League Two club  Swindon Town.

Club career
On 24 February 2021, Lavinier made his first-team debut for Spurs in the Europa League as a substitute for Matt Doherty in a 4–0 home win over Wolfsberger AC in the second leg of the round of 32 tie. 

On 1 September 2022, Lavinier signed for Swindon Town.

International career
Lavinier has represented England at youth international level but has also spent time training with Portugal U18s.

Career statistics

Club

References

2000 births
Living people
Footballers from Greater London
English footballers
England youth international footballers
English people of Portuguese descent
Association football defenders
Chelsea F.C. players
Tottenham Hotspur F.C. players
Swindon Town F.C. players